K36 may refer to:
 K-36 trailer, an American military trailer
 Ikeda Station (Hokkaido)
 NPP Zvezda K-36, an ejection seat
 "Or che il dover – Tali e cotanti sono", a concert aria by Wolfgang Amadeus Mozart
 Potassium-36, an isotope of potassium
 Rio Grande class K-36, an American steam locomotive